Dmitriy Nikolayevich Byakov (born 9 April 1978) is a Kazakh football midfielder. He plays for FC Zhetysu. Byakov also plays for the Kazakhstan national football team. His first name is also sometimes translated as Dmitry or Dmitri.

Club career
Dmitriy Byakov's club career started in the year 1998 in the club CSKA Kairat Almaty.

Incident
On 9 April 2003, on his 25th birthday, Dmitriy was stabbed in the heart after a brawl in a night club in Almaty. After two years of recovery he returned to professional level.

International career
Dmitriy first played for the Kazakhstan national football team in 2000. He was Kazakhstan's top scorer in UEFA Euro 2008 qualifying, scoring 5 goals against Azerbaijan, Finland, Belgium, Poland and Portugal, three of which were away goals.

Career statistics

International goals

Notes

External links

Dmitriy Byakov's profile at UEFA

1978 births
Living people
Kazakhstani footballers
Association football midfielders
Kazakhstan international footballers
Kazakhstani people of Russian descent
Kazakhstan Premier League players
Stabbing survivors
FC Zhenis Astana players
FC Kairat players
FC Shakhter Karagandy players
FC Anzhi Makhachkala players
FC Zhetysu players